Chuukic, historically also rendered Trukic, is a subgroup of the Chuukic–Pohnpeic family of the Austronesian language family. The languages are primarily spoken in Chuuk State and Yap State of the Federated States of Micronesia.

Languages
Sonsorol and Tobian (close enough to each other to often be considered dialects)
Chuukese
Woleaian and Ulithian
Puluwatese, Namonuito, and Tanapag
Carolinian
Satawalese and Mortlockese (closely related)
Pááfang
Mapia (extinct)

Phonology

1 before

References 

 
Chuukic–Pohnpeic languages